The St. Martin Parish Courthouse, on S. Main St. in St. Martinville, Louisiana, is a Greek Revival-style courthouse which was built in 1859.  It was listed on the National Register of Historic Places in 1981.

It was built in form of a four-column Ionic temple, and is two stories with a central hall plan on each floor.  The walls are stuccoed brick;  the columns are brick with stucco fluting;  the bases and capitals of the columns are of cast iron.

It was expanded in 1937 with the addition of a relatively large rear wing that holds the present courtroom.  The original building was modified by installation of marble floors and dado and by installation of an oculus in the tympanum.  An iron interior staircase was replaced.  The interior has no specific noticeable features remaining from the original 1859 construction.

The courthouse was expanded again in the 1950s and 1960s by addition of two wings with recessed pediments and pilasters.

It was deemed significant in 1980 in the state of Louisiana as one of just four antebellum courthouses still in use, and as one of few temple form Greek Revival buildings.

References

External links

Courthouses on the National Register of Historic Places in Louisiana
National Register of Historic Places in St. Martin Parish, Louisiana
Greek Revival architecture in Louisiana
Government buildings completed in 1859
Parish courthouses in Louisiana
1859 establishments in Louisiana